Australomedusidae is a family of cnidarians belonging to the order Anthoathecata.

Genera:
 Australomedusa Russell, 1970
 Octorathkea Uchida, 1927
 Zhangiella Bouillon, Gravili, Pages, Gili & Boero, 2006

References

 
Filifera
Cnidarian families